The 2014–15 Troy Trojans men's basketball team represented Troy University during the 2014–15 NCAA Division I men's basketball season. The Trojans, led by second year head coach Phil Cunningham, played their home games at Trojan Arena and were members of the Sun Belt Conference. They finished the season 10–19, 5–15 in Sun Belt play to finish in last place. They failed to qualify for the Sun Belt tournament.

Roster

Schedule

|-
!colspan=9 style=""|  Exhibition

|-
!colspan=9 style=""|  Regular season

References

Troy Trojans men's basketball seasons
Troy
2014 in sports in Alabama
2015 in sports in Alabama